Ethnarch (pronounced , also ethnarches) is a term that refers generally to political leadership over a common ethnic group or homogeneous kingdom. Strong's Concordance gives the definition of 'ethnarch' as "the governor (not king) of a district."

Antiquity
The title first appeared in the Hellenistic Middle East, possibly in Judea. In the First book of Maccabees the word is used three times (1 Maccabees 14:47 and 15:1-2), where Simon Thassi is referred to as the high priest and ethnarch of the Judeans.

It was used in the region even after it fell under the dominion of Rome, and into the early Roman Empire, to refer to rulers of vassal kingdoms who did not rise to the level of kings. The Romans used the terms natio and gens for a people as a genetic and cultural entity, regardless of political statehood.

The best-known is probably Herod Archelaus, son of Herod the Great, who was ethnarch of Samaria, Judea (Biblical Judah), and Idumea (Biblical Edom), from the death of his father in 4 BC to AD 6. This region is known as the Tetrarchy of Judea. His brother Philip received the north-east of the realm and was styled Tetrarch (circa 'ruler of a quarter'); and Galilee was given to Herod Antipas, who bore the same title. Consequently, Archelaus' title singled him out as the senior ruler, higher in rank than the tetrarchs and the chief of the Jewish nation; these three sovereignties were in a sense reunited under Herod Agrippa from AD 41 to 44.

Previously, Hyrcanus II, one of the later Hasmonean rulers of Judea, had also held the title of ethnarch, as well as that of High Priest.

In the New Testament the word is used only once by the Apostle Paul in his Second Epistle to the Corinthians (2 Corinthians 11:32). However the definition of the word in terms of the actual jurisdiction and public office of the ethnarch may not be accurately determined.

Byzantine Empire
The Byzantines used the term generically to refer to the rulers of barbarian tribes or realms outside the boundaries of their empire. In a Christian context, where ethnikos meant "pagan," some Church Fathers used the term ethnarches to designate pagan national gods. In the 10th century, the term acquired a more technical sense, when it was given to several high-ranking commanders. Although the specific nature of the title is not attested, it is generally accepted that in the 10th–11th centuries, it signified the commanders of the contingent of foreign mercenaries serving in the Byzantine army.

Ottoman Empire
Rather different was the case of minority community ethnarchs, especially within the Islamic Ottoman Empire that were recognized as legitimate entities (millet) and thus allowed to be heard by the government through an officially acknowledged representative, though without political persona.

When the Ottoman Sultan Mehmet II decided to give such dialogue a more formal nature, the logical choice for the major Orthodox Christian communities was the Greek Orthodox Ecumenical Patriarch of Constantinople. The non-Chalcedonian Christians (Armenians, Syriacs, and Copts) were represented by the Armenian Patriarchate of Constantinople. For the far smaller, but also influential Jewish diaspora, a similar position was granted to the Hakham Bashi, i.e., chief rabbi.

Modern Greece and Cyprus
In modern Greek usage, the term has the connotation of "father of the nation", and is widely used as an epithet applied to perhaps the most influential political leader in modern Greek history: Eleftherios Venizelos. In the context of modern Cyprus, the term nearly always refers to the nation's first president, Archbishop Makarios.

Notes

References and sources
References

Sources
Flavius Josephus
 
 STRONGS NT 1481: ἐθνάρχης. Strong's Concordance (Bible Hub). Retrieved: 18 August 2014.
  Γεώργιος Γρατσέας. "Έθνάρχης." Θρησκευτική και Ηθική Εγκυκλοπαίδεια (ΘΗΕ). Τόμος 5 (Διοκλητιανός-Ζώτος). Αθηναι – Αθαν. Μαρτινος, 1964. σελ. 351.

Government of the Ottoman Empire
Religious leadership roles
Byzantine military offices
Constitutional state types
Monarchy
Oligarchy
Titles of national or ethnic leadership
Herodian dynasty
Hasmonean dynasty